Nawai Watan (Balochi: روزنامہ نوای وطن) is a Balochi-language newspaper published in Quetta, Balochistan, Pakistan. It is mainly distributed in Quetta with a limited circulation.

See also 
 List of newspapers in Pakistan

References

Balochi-language newspapers
Newspapers published in Pakistan
Publications with year of establishment missing
Mass media in Quetta